Kolbe Catholic College is an independent Roman Catholic co-educational secondary day school, located in the outer Melbourne suburb of , in Victoria, Australia. The patron saint of the college is Maximilian Kolbe, who was murdered in Auschwitz concentration camp on 14 August 1941. Established in 2008, the college's enrolments are expected to reach approximately 1,000 students for Years 7 to 12.

Curriculum 
Kolbe's curriculum includes

Year 7
 Journey in Faith (Religion Education)
 English 
 Humanities
 Mathematics
 Science 
 Health & Physical Education 
 LOTE (Italian)
 Sport

(Electives)
 Visual Arts*
 Wood Technology* 
 Music* 
 Drama *

Year 8
 Journey in Faith (Religion Education)
 English 
 Humanities
 Mathematics
 Science 
 Health & Physical Education 
 LOTE (Italian) 
 Sport

(Electives)
 Drama
 Music
 Food Technology
 Visual Arts

(Learning-enhanced activities)
 Inquiry Minds Program (I.M.P)- S.T.E.M

Year 9
 English 
 Science 
 Mathematics
 Journey in Faith (Religion Education)
 Health & Physically Education
 Humanities
 Sport

(Electives)
 Game Play & Health Promotion
 Drama
 Dance
 Music
 Food Technology 
 LOTE (Italian)
 Visual Arts
 Multimedia
 Visual Communication & Design 
 Wood Technology
 Forensic Science

(Learning-enhanced activities)
 Learning Enhancement Activity Day (L.E.A.D)- S.T.E.M

Year 10
 English 
 Science 
 Mathematics
 Journey in Faith (Religion Education)
 Health & Physically Education (one Semester) 
 Humanities (one Semester)

(Electives)
 Drama
 Music
 LOTE (Italian)
 Art
 Media Studies
 Visual Communication & Design 
 Wood Technology
 Exercise Sports Science
 Outdoor Education & Environmental Studies 
 Literature
 Extension Maths 1 (Semester one only)
 Extension Maths 2 (Semester two only)
 Chemistry
 Systems Technology Robotics
 Food Technology 
 Commerce
 Psychology
 Photography 
 Australia in the Modern World 
 Economics
 Our Changing Environment 
 Powerful People 
 Lifestyle, Diet & Fitness (Girls Only)
(Learning-enhanced activities)
 Pathways

Year 11 & 12
 VCE Subjects Semester 1 and 2
 VCAL Subjects Semester 1 and 2

Facilities 
 Building A (2009)
 Building B (K as of 2018) (2009)
 Building C/Administration (2010)
 Science Building (2011)
 Gymnasium (2011)
 State of the Art Building (2011)
 Senior Building/VCE/VCAL (2013) 
 4 Out Door Basketball Courts (2009) 
 Soccer Pitch
 Canteen/Hospitality Building (2017)
 Building B (2019)

Activities 
The college runs many annual events such as swimming and athletics carnivals, cross country competitions, an annual presentation night, College feast day, a performing arts evening, and house feast day (different day for each house).

The College is a member of the Sports Association of Catholic Co-educational Secondary Schools (SACCSS). Every year level (7-10) in the college takes part in a sports competition called Premiere league, where the selected year level competes in more than six sport against other secondary schools around Melbourne that are members of the SACCSS association. Sports include:
 Football (Soccer)- Years 7, 8, 9, 10
 Basketball- Years 7, 8, 9, 10
 Volleyball- Years 7, 8, 9, 10
 Netball (Girls)- Years 7, 8, 9, 10
 AFL (Boys)- Years 7 & 9
 Cricket (Boys)- Years 8 & 10

See also

 Kolbe Catholic College, Rockingham
 List of non-government schools in Victoria
 Catholic education in Australia

References

Catholic secondary schools in Melbourne
2008 establishments in Australia
Educational institutions established in 2008